Mike Dunn (born 20 November 1971) is an English retired professional snooker player who lives in Redcar.

Having first turned professional in 1991, Dunn has been ranked within the top 64 players in the world since 2002, reaching his highest ranking, at 32nd, in October 2010. He has enjoyed the best form of his career since 2013, reaching the last 16 stage of three tournaments, and the semi-finals of the 2014 China Open and the 2015 Ruhr Open. He announced his retirement from the game after losing in the third qualifying round of the 2020 World Championship.

Career

1991 to 1997

Born in 1971, Dunn turned professional in 1991. His first six seasons came without any success, and although he improved his ranking each year, he was relegated as the world number 139 in 1997, as the secondary UK Tour was formed to run below the professional main tour.

Competing on the UK Tour for the 1997/1998 season, Dunn reached the last 16 at Event Three, where he lost 2–5 to former world number two Tony Knowles. His performances that season were sufficient for him to regain his professional status at its conclusion.

Since 1998

In his first season back on the main tour, Dunn reached the last 32 at the 1999 Welsh Open, where he beat five opponents, including Munraj Pal, Ian Brumby, Paul Wykes and Mark King, before being eliminated 5–1 by Alain Robidoux.

Beginning 1999/2000 ranked 134th, Dunn would enter the 2000s within the top 100 professional players; a run to the last 32 at the 2000 Thailand Masters, where Matthew Stevens beat him 5–1, contributed to £13,000 in prize money for that season, and he finished it in 93rd position.

Dunn's stock continued to rise steadily the following year, but his only showing in the latter stages of an event came at the 2001 Thailand Masters; there, he recovered from 1–3 down to 3–3 against Stephen Lee, but lost 3–5.

As the world number 72 for the 2001/2002 season, Dunn enjoyed his best form yet at the 2002 World Championship, defeating Stephen Croft 10–2, David McDonnell 10–8, Lee Walker 10–2, David Finbow 10–5 and Billy Snaddon 10–9 – having trailed 1–5 – to qualify for the main stages at the Crucible Theatre for the first time. Drawn against Stevens, he came to trail 1–7 and, although he recovered well to 6–9, could not prevent a 6–10 loss. Nevertheless, the performance earned Dunn £14,500, and he broke into the top 64 as a result.

The next few seasons were anticlimactic, Dunn's best progress being a run to the semi-final of the non-ranking Benson & Hedges Championship, where he lost 3–6 to Mehmet Husnu; however, 2005 heralded a first-ever last-16 finish, at the 2005 Malta Cup. There, he beat Leo Fernandez, Michael Judge, Marco Fu, local wildcard entry Simon Zammit and David Gray – whitewashing the latter 5–0 – before losing 3–5, again to Stevens.
Having begun 2004/2005 ranked 53rd, Dunn finished it 54th – the first time he had ever finished a season in a lower position than at the start.

At the 2006 UK Championship, Dunn defeated Jamie Jones, Mark Davis and James Wattana to reach the last 32, but was heavily beaten by the resurgent Ken Doherty, losing 1–9 to the Irishman.

Doherty again overcame him at the China Open the following season, this time a 5–2 victor; Dunn came within one match of making his second Crucible appearance in 2008, but having led Dave Harold 4–3, went on to lose 4–10.

2008/2009 brought a run to the last 16 at the inaugural – and only – Bahrain Championship, where he beat Shaun Murphy 5–4 in the last 32, but lost by the same scoreline in his next match against Barry Hawkins.

After several last-64 finishes at the start of season 2010/2011, Dunn briefly entered the top 32 in the rankings in October 2010, but dropped back out within several months; he beat Stevens, Alfie Burden and Stuart Bingham in the 2011 Snooker Shoot-out, but lost his quarter-final 'match' 14–90 to Ronnie O'Sullivan.

By 2014, Dunn had endured several years of poor form and was in danger of losing his place on tour at the end of the season. However, at the 2014 China Open, he mustered the best performance of his career, beating Tom Ford, Peter Lines, Tian Pengfei, Craig Steadman and world number one Mark Selby to reach the semi-finals. There, he faced the home favourite, Ding Junhui, for a place in the final, but was outclassed, losing 6–0. This run earned Dunn £21,000 and was enough to ensure he would begin the 2014/2015 season ranked 58th, keeping his professional status.

The next season brought only one last-16 finish, at the 2014 Haining Open, where he lost 3–4 to the eventual finalist, Peter Lines's son Oliver, but Dunn's results were sufficient to move him up to 42nd in the end-of-season rankings, his highest position since 2011.

On 25 July 2020, Dunn announced his retirement from competitive snooker, ending his 29-year career as a professional.

Personal life

Mike Dunn is now the manager of Q House Snooker Academy Darlington, He is also a WPBSA director for World Snooker, and was in the presentation party at the final of the 2007 UK Championship. Dunn supports Middlesbrough F.C.

Performance and rankings timeline

References

External links

Mike Dunn at worldsnooker.com
 Official Mike Dunn Snooker Practice App
 Profile on Yahoo! Sport

Living people
1971 births
English snooker players
Sportspeople from Middlesbrough
Competitors at the 2009 World Games
People from Redcar